The Combination routine competition of the 2014 European Aquatics Championships was held on 15–17 August.

Results
The preliminary round was held on 15 August at 18:00. The preliminary round was held on 17 August at 18:00.

References

2014 European Aquatics Championships